Gordon Addison MacDonald Sr. (January 8, 1902 – August 29, 1950) was an American football and basketball player and coach.  He served as the head football coach at Alma College from 1936 to 1943, compiling a record of 33–22–5.  MacDonald played football and basketball at Alma, from which he graduated in 1926. In 1929, he married Eleanor Musselman.

Coaching career
MacDonald was the head football coach at Alma College in Alma, Michigan for eight seasons, from 1936 until 1943.  His coaching record at Alma was 33–22–5.

Death
MacDonald died in Colorado on August 29, 1950 in a hospital after a "long illness".

Head coaching record

College football

References

1902 births
1950 deaths
American football fullbacks
American men's basketball players
Basketball coaches from Michigan
Alma Scots football coaches
Alma Scots football players
Alma Scots men's basketball coaches
Alma Scots men's basketball players
High school football coaches in Michigan
Sportspeople from Bay City, Michigan
Coaches of American football from Michigan
Players of American football from Michigan
Basketball players from Michigan